Shreshtha Vihar is a posh residential colony situated in East Delhi which is adjacent to Uttar Pradesh. It consists mainly of 
kothis and villas. There are two apartments called Vivek Apartment and Gharonda Apartment. Many professionals reside here. It has many big parks and nearby Yamuna Sports Complex serves as the sports hub. Nearby localities are Jagriti Enclave, Surajmal Vihar, Hargovind Enclave, AGCR Enclave. D.A.V Public School Sreshtha Vihar is located at the outskirts of the colony. The colony has a Hindu temple and a community center for celebrating small occasions and has a central park. Nearby metro stations are Karkarduma and Anand Vihar on the blue line and Karkarduma court on the newly constructed pink line of Delhi Metro. 

The locality has a good market with all amenities including premium branch of SBI Bank, LIC office, stationery shop, departmental stores, tailoring shops, Garment manufacturing unit, SBL Homeopathy office, beauty saloon, barber shop, eating joints, medicine shops, clinic of eminent doctors and dietician & nutritionist and many more. Recently in the month of May 2018 the market renovated and got face upliftment with ultramodern public toilet, lamp posts, black stone flooring and cemented chairs. Shreshtha Vihar is one of the richest societies in East Delhi. 

Delhi
East Delhi district